Sagola or Sagola may refer to:

 Sagola, a genus of beetle
 Sagola Township, Michigan